Americano Creek is a  long westward-flowing stream in the California counties of Sonoma and Marin. This article covers both watercourses.

Course
It passes a closed landfill and crosses the Valley Ford Road. At this point the channel becomes better defined and also deep enough for kayaking during the winter months. Kayakers access the creek here by means of an unpaved boat launch road that is reachable from Marsh Road.

The lower reach of the creek flows westward past the small community of Bloomfield, paralleling Valley Ford Road, and passes under State Route 1, known locally as "Highway 1" or "the Shoreline Highway", at which point it begins to define the Sonoma-Marin county line.

Just west of the highway, the watercourse's official name changes to Estero Americano. It meanders past the town of Valley Ford. Valley Ford-Franklin School Road crosses at the last bridge across the estero. Shortly thereafter, Ebabias Creek enters from the north. The last  of the estero are virtually without road access or visibility from public roads.

Its mouth lies near the north end of the Gulf of the Farallones National Marine Sanctuary.

Environmental factors
California's 1994 water quality report designated all of Americano Creek and most of the Estero Americano as "impaired" streamways as defined in section 303(d) of the Federal Water Resource Statutes, due to runoff from pasture land and feedlots. As recently as 1987, a single gully near Americano Creek released 4,000 tons/year of sediment, contributing to flooding in downstream communities and making the creek non-navigable. Pollutants found at hazardous level in the creek have included fecal bacteria, copper, ammonia, and zinc.

The creek's headwaters area is a historic habitat for a number of rare and endangered species including Sebastopol meadowfoam, Limnanthes vinculans; showy Indian clover, Trifolium amoenum; and Pitkin Marsh lily, Lilium pardolinum ssp pitkinese. This area also contains a closed landfill, and as of 2006, a hard rock quarry was proposed for it.

Americano Creek is dry 4 to 6 months each year. For its first , the stream meanders through a broad valley dominated by agricultural uses, principally cattle grazing. The valley floor is flat and wide, especially at the lower elevations. Due to siltation, virtually no rocks are evident in the streambed. Grazing occurs in the streambed itself, putting pathogens directly into the water. During the rainy season (November to April), this bottomland consists in places of an expansive marshy area. Most native wetland vegetation has been destroyed by ongoing grazing.

The lower reach of Americano Creek is also surrounded by agricultural uses. However, the channel becomes better separated from grazing areas. The estero itself is a federally protected area.

Flow rates are highly seasonal with the heaviest flows occurring in the rainy winter months. Water testing of Americano Creek and Estero has generally found pH (acidity) levels in the range of 7.5 to 8.0, which satisfies the guidelines in the State of California Basin Plan.

In some years, a sand bar forms at the mouth of the estero, restricting tidal exchange. High levels of salinity have been observed in the estero.

The Estero Americano is protected by the Estero Americano State Marine Recreational Management Area.  Like an underwater park, this marine protected area helps conserve ocean wildlife and marine ecosystems.

History
Two permanent Coast Miwok villages were located on the Estero Americano: one named Uli-yomi at the head of the estero, and another named Awachi at its mouth. The earliest Spanish maps show the creek and its estuary as Estero Americano. At the time of the Russian colony at Fort Ross, the Americano Creek was known as the Avacha River. To counter the Russian settlement General Vallejo sent three "Americanos", Edward McIntosh, James Black (1810–1870), and James Dawson, to settle just southeast of Bodega Bay.  These three men came to California as sailors with Captain John B.R. Cooper, brother-in-law of General Vallejo.  Black settled upon what is now known as Rancho Cañada de Jonive, while Dawson and McIntosh settled upon Rancho Estero Americano. Rancho Cañada de Pogolimi was a Mexican land grant given in 1844  by Governor Manuel Micheltorena to María Antonia Cazares, widow of James Dawson.

The Ebabias Creek tributary is shown on a diseño of the Rancho Cañada de Pogolimi grant in 1844 but the possible Indian origin has not been determined.

Bridges
Bridges cross Americano Creek in three locations: Gericke Road, Roblar Road and Valley Ford Road.

The Estero Americano is crossed in three places: Valley Ford-Franklin School Road, Highway One, and Slaughter House Road. All three crossing are concrete continuous slab structures.

See also
Estero Americano State Marine Recreational Management Area
List of watercourses in the San Francisco Bay Area
Overgrazing
Water pollution

References

External links
Estero Americano Watershed description and map on Marin County Watershed Program pages
Americano Creek water temperature habitat designation
Americano Creek monthly flow rates

Estuaries of California
Rivers of Marin County, California
Rivers of Sonoma County, California
Rivers of Northern California